Lavinia Warner is a British television writer and producer. She created several successful TV series in the 1980s and 1990s, all of which featured women in the leading roles.

These included the World War II female internee drama Tenko (1981-5) for the BBC, secret agent drama Wish Me Luck (1988–90) for London Weekend Television (LWT) and the taxi-firm series Rides (1992-3), again for the BBC. For the latter two series she also acted as producer. Warner is now the CEO of Warner Sisters, an independent production company.

Career
After studying history and psychology at university, Warner became a PA in the drama department at London Weekend Television (LWT), before moving on to Thames Television as a researcher, mainly on This is Your Life. After this she worked in the BBC Features, Current Affairs and Drama departments as a freelance producer and director.  After the launch of Channel 4 in 1982, she set up her own independent production company, Warner Sisters, which initially focussed on making television programmes.

In 1983 she published "Women Beyond the Wire: A Story of Prisoners of the Japanese 1942-45" which she had co-written.

Television programmes
1979: 
Women in Captivity
A Life with Crime
Private Lives
1981-84: Tenko
1984: GI Brides (won the Broadcasting Press Guild Award and was BAFTA nominated for Best Documentary)
1985: Tenko Reunion
1985: Lizzie - An Amazon Adventure (about adventuress Lizzie Hessel)
1987: Wish Me Luck  
1991: Selling Hitler (based on the book by Robert Harris)
1992: Rides
1995: Dangerous Lady
1995: A Village Affair
1996: The Bite
1998: The Jump
2001: Do or Die
2011: The Runaway

Other activities
One-time Vice-Chair of PACT
One-time Edinburgh Television Festival committee member
An original member of the 25% Campaign for increased Independent access to the BBC and ITV
Consultant to Hollywood director Bruce Beresford on his feature film Paradise Road.  Warner's book Women Beyond the Wire: A Story of Prisoners of the Japanese 1942-45 (co-written with John Sandilands) was the prime source material for the film.

References

External links
Lavinia Warner on Warner Sisters website

Living people
Year of birth missing (living people)